These are the Spain women's national football team all time results:

Results

1983–1989

1990–1999

2000–2009

2010–2019

2020–present

Results in unofficial matches
This is a list of the Spain women's national football team's unofficial results from their inception to the present day that are not accorded the status of official internationals, not being recognized by FIFA. Player appearances and goals in these matches are also not counted to their totals.

All-time team record

Head-to-head
The following table shows Spain's all-time international record, from February 5, 1983.

Performance year by year

Competitive record

Stats

Results frequency

Opponents

Biggest wins

Biggest defeats

Longest unbeaten run

1,221 days without a defeat match (between 9 March 2020 and 12 June 2022)

Most consecutive wins

Longest run of games scored in

Longest streak without conceding a goal

1,531 minutes without allowing goals (between 9 March 2020 and 17 February 2022)

Venues in Spain
Only official matches

Record home attendances
11,209 vs.  at El Sadar, Pamplona (11 October 2022)
10,044 vs.  at Riazor, A Coruña (4 October 2019)
9,182 vs.  at José Rico Pérez, Alicante (22 January 2019)
8,833 vs.  at José Rico Pérez, Alicante (7 April 2022)
7,727 vs.  at Las Gaunas, Logroño (4 September 2018)
7,593 vs.  at El Sardinero, Santander (31 August 2018)

Record out-of-home attendances
Away ground: 28,994 vs.  at Falmer Stadium, Brighton and Hove (20 July 2022)
Neutral ground: 28,623 vs.  at Olympic Stadium, Montreal (13 June 2015)

References

External links
Royal Spanish Football Federation website
Profile at FIFA.com
Profile at UEFA.com

Spain national football team results
Spain women's national football team
Women's national association football team results